Bolshiye Toktashi (Măn Tuktaş) is a rural locality (a village) in Alikovsky District of the Chuvash Republic, Russia, located  southwest of the district's administrative center of Alikovo.

The majority of the village population is Chuvash.  Village facilities include a club, a library, a first-aid post, a shop, and Ilya Toktash Literature Museum.

The Khirlep River flows in the vicinity of the village.

The climate in the village is moderately continental, with long cold winters and warm summers.

Etymology
The Chuvash word "man" means "big", while "Toktash" is a proper name.

Notable natives
Anatoly Serep, Chuvash writer
Arkady Malov, Chuvash writer, translator
Ille Toktash, Chuvash writer, poet, translator, folklorist
Gerasim Pileš, Chuvash writer, grafic artist, playwright, sculptor
Nikolai Ivanov, Chuvash artist

Further reading
L. A. Efimov, "Элӗк Енӗ", Alikovo, 1994.
"Аликовская энциклопедия", (Encyklopaedia of Alikovo) editors: Efimov L.A., Efimov E.L., Ananjev A. A., Terentjev G. K., Cheboksary, 2009, .

References

Rural localities in Chuvashia
Alikovsky District
Kurmyshsky Uyezd